One of the lines of Honda motorcycles is the CM Series and CMX Series of cruiser-style motorcycles.  Some of the CM series engines existed in other motorcycles so we included them in this list.  Some of the bikes using the CM/CMX engine or model line have been:

Smaller Engine Family
 CM185T — 1978–1979 Twinstar (6V Points Ignition)
 CM 200T — 1980–1982 Twinstar (1980 6V Points, 1981+ 12V CDI)
 CM125
 CM125T
 CM 250 — 1982–1984 "Custom", predecessor to the current Rebel
 CMX 250 — 1985–1987, 1995–1996, 1998–2016, The basic Rebel model
 CB250 - 1991-2008 Nighthawk, successor to the CMX250 Rebel

Larger Engine Family
 CM 400 — Precursor to the Nighthawk series of street bikes
 CM 400 Custom and Hondamatic Models
 CB 400 Custom and Hondamatic Models
 CM 450 Custom and Hondamatic Models
 CB 450 Custom, Hondamatic, and Nighthawk models
 CMX 450 — 1986–1987, The more-powerful, customized Rebel

Modern Engine Family
 CMX 300 -- 2017-present
 CMX 500 — 2017–present

CM series